Nay Ka Mway Tae La is a 2003 Burmese drama film, directed by starring Kyaw Hein, Min Maw Kun, Tint Tint Htun and Eaindra Kyaw Zin.

Cast
Kyaw Hein as Chek Kyi
Min Maw Kun as Pone Ka Lay, Kyaw Kyaw
Tint Tint Htun as Tha Ra Phu
Eaindra Kyaw Zin as Yamin
Zaw Win Naing as Gate Kyi
Bay Lu Wa as Yate Kyi
Kyaw Htoo as Htee Kyi

Awards

References

2003 films
2000s Burmese-language films
Burmese drama films
Films shot in Myanmar
2003 drama films